Dzintar Klavan (born 18 June 1961) is an Estonian former professional footballer who played as a midfielder. He played for FC Flora Tallinn, JK Viljandi Tulevik, and FC Warrior Valga.

International career
Klavan made a total of 19 caps for the Estonia national team during his career. He earned his first official cap on 21 February 1993, when Estonia met Latvia in an indoor friendly.

Personal life
He has a son, Ragnar Klavan, who is a professional footballer playing for Paide Linnameeskond. Ragnar has been capped by the Estonian national team.

References

1961 births
Living people
Sportspeople from Viljandi
Estonian footballers
Association football midfielders
Estonia international footballers
FC Warrior Valga players
FC Flora players
Viljandi JK Tulevik players
Estonian expatriate footballers
Estonian expatriate sportspeople in Finland
Expatriate footballers in Finland
Estonian expatriate sportspeople in Germany
Expatriate footballers in Germany